The surname Chumak, from the Ukrainian term chumak, may refer to:

Allan Chumak (1935–2017), Russian hypnotist and faith healer
Dmytro Chumak (fencer) (born 1980), Ukrainian épée fencer
Dmytro Chumak (weightlifter) (born 1964), Ukrainian weightlifter
Igor Chumak (born 1964), Russian team handball player
Nestor Chumak (born 1988), Canadian bassist for PUP
Roman Chumak (born 1982), Ukrainian football goalkeeper
Yevhen Chumak (born 1995), Ukrainian football midfielder
Yuriy Chumak (born 1962), Ukrainian former football goalkeeper